This list is an attempt to document every song released by American-British pop rock band The Monkees. It does not include songs released only separately by the individual members.

Official Monkees songs

Known unreleased songs

Other collaborations
This section is for songs featuring collaborations with two or more of the band members but not (yet) officially released as Monkees songs. This section only refers to songs released on albums or as singles, not to live performances (unless released on an album).

 
Monkees, The